The Hawaii Rainbow Warriors volleyball team represents the University of Hawaii at Manoa in NCAA men's competition. The team currently competes in the Big West Conference after leaving its longtime home of the Mountain Pacific Sports Federation in 2018. The Rainbow Warriors are currently coached by Charlie Wade.

Year-by-year results

Notes

Home court 
The Rainbow Warriors have played their home games at the Stan Sheriff Center since 1995, and have had 11 sellouts of their games, the most recent being March 6, 2020 against BYU.

Since joining the MPSF, and later, the Big West, Hawaii has consistently been one of the leaders in the country in home attendance. Under Charlie Wade, the Rainbow Warriors are nearly unbeatable at the Stan Sheriff Center, averaging over 12 home wins a season. They also have posted three undefeated home seasons in the last five years, most recently in 2022.

See also 
 List of NCAA men's volleyball programs

References

External links 
 Official website

Hawaii Rainbow Warriors volleyball
College men's volleyball teams in the United States
Big West Conference men's volleyball